Jahangir IV, was the last ruler of the Paduspanid branch of Kojur. He was the son and successor of Sultan Mohammad ibn Jahangir.

Biography
In 1593, Jahangir arrived to the court of Abbas I of Persia, and established good relations with him. However, during a festival in Qazvin, Jahangir killed two prominent Safavid nobles. This made Abbas invade his domains in 1598, where he besieged Kojur. Jahangir managed to flee, but was captured and killed by a Pro-Safavid Paduspanid named Hasan Lavasani, marking the end of the Paduspanid dynasty.

Sources

 
 

16th-century monarchs in Asia
16th-century Iranian people
1598 deaths
Baduspanids
Year of birth unknown